The resistive skin time is a characteristic time of typical magnetohydrodynamic (MHD) phenomena.

Definition
The resistive skin time is defined as:

Magnetohydrodynamics